Podgorica Airport  is an international airport serving the Montenegrin capital of Podgorica and the surrounding region. It is one of two international airports in Montenegro, the other being Tivat Airport. Both are operated by the state-owned company Airports of Montenegro (Аеродроми Црне Горе / Aerodromi Crne Gore).

The airport is locally known as Golubovci Airport as it is located within the administrative boundaries of the town of Golubovci. The IATA code of the airport is still TGD because Podgorica was named Titograd (after Josip Broz Tito) from 1946 to 1992, during the time in which the airport opened. It is the main hub for Di Air and was the main hub for Montenegro Airlines.

History
The history of civil aviation in Podgorica began on 26 May 1928, when an Aeroput Potez 29/2 landed on a grass runway at a small airfield located near the city's current train station. The plane was on an experimental Belgrade-Skopje-Podgorica-Mostar-Sarajevo-Belgrade line, organized to determine the viability of linking Belgrade with southern Yugoslavia by air. On 5 May 1930, scheduled passenger service began on a Belgrade-Sarajevo-Podgorica line. Aeroput used Farman F.300 aircraft on this line.

World War II brought an end to passenger traffic at the airfield. In 1943 and 1944, the airfield was used by the Luftwaffe in then German-occupied Montenegro.  It was a frequent target in the now infamous bombing of Podgorica, which resulted in significant German losses.

After the war, passenger service resumed on 8 April 1947, with newly formed JAT flights to Belgrade on a Douglas C-47 converted for passenger use. A cargo line to Belgrade was later established in 1957. 

The airport was moved to its present location south of the city in 1961. It featured a  asphalt runway and was modernized and refurbished in 1977. The majority of traffic in this period consisted of scheduled flights to Belgrade, mostly with McDonnell Douglas DC-9 aircraft. Špiro Mugoša Airport now occupies the former site.

On 23 April 2003, the ownership of the airport was transferred from JAT Airways to Airports of Montenegro, a public company owned by the Government of Montenegro. Along with the formation and growth of Montenegro Airlines, this contributed to an increase in services from the airport. The decades-long practice of the airport being largely a feeder airport for Belgrade was dropped in favor of a more diverse network of scheduled passenger flights. 

A major renovation and expansion took place in 2006, with refurbishment and extension of the apron and improvements to the taxiways system, airfield lighting system, and power supply. An entirely new passenger terminal was opened on 14 May 2006, while the old passenger terminal underwent reconstruction and refurbishment in 2009. 

The improved taxiway system allowed for wide-body aircraft to be serviced at the airport. Thus, the airport began servicing Il-86s and the first Boeing 747 freighter arrived at the airport in April 2008. 

In December 2020, Montenegro Airlines went into liquidation, leaving the airport without a home carrier. Air Montenegro started operations on 8 February 2021.

Facilities

Terminals

As air traffic in Montenegro saw a rapid increase in the 2000s, the old passenger terminal, a small cobblestone building, was retired after the new terminal was built, except for servicing small-volume charter flights. The new passenger terminal, comprising , opened on 14 May 2006. It has eight departure and two arrival gates, and is able to handle up to 1 million passengers annually. The terminal does not feature jetways, as the number of passengers at the airport is not high enough to necessitate them.

The main (new) terminal building is a modern aluminium and glass structure, featuring contemporary architectural solutions such as indirect lighting throughout the building. Since its opening, it has featured a Costa Coffee outlet, two newspaper stalls, a duty-free shop, rent-a-car posts, and a bank outlet. Although the airport is considered low-risk, security screening has been visibly increased since the construction of the new terminal. Security measures and monitoring that are standard for European airports are applied in the terminal.

The old terminal building was completely renovated and reopened on 15 September 2009 and is now intended for VIP use and general aviation.

Runway
The airport has ICAO classification 4E ILS Cat I, though ILS landing is only possible on runway 36; the northern approach to runway 18 is visual only, possible under perfect VMC. This is due to the proximity of the Dinaric Alps in the north.

Military use

Podgorica Airport is a public international airport, but shares the main runway with Podgorica's military airbase. Military facilities include an  airbase area adjacent to the main runway, as well as the Šipčanik complex. The Šipčanik complex consisted of an underground aircraft shelter tunneled into the eponymous hill, and an adjacent narrow 08/26 runway, which could be used to scramble jets stored in the shelter.  This runway is connected to the main airport complex via a  taxiway cut through surrounding vineyards.

On 9 December 1999, the airport was briefly seized by the Army of Yugoslavia in a standoff between the central government and the Montenegrin authorities after Montenegro tried to control the airport independently from Belgrade.

Airlines and destinations
The following airlines serve scheduled and seasonal services to and from Podgorica Airport:

Statistics

Passengers

Busiest routes

Ground transportation

Podgorica Airport is accessible by the Podgorica - Bar road (E65/E80), via a short detour. A stretch of this road, from Podgorica to the airport, has been upgraded to expressway standard. A drive from the city center to the airport usually takes less than 15 minutes. Public transportation to and from airport is covered by L-20 bus line to city center, charter bus lines to other Montenegrin cities, and taxi service.

Accidents and incidents
On 11 September 1973, Podgorica Airport was the destination of JAT Airways Flight 769, a Sud Aviation SE-210 Caravelle 6-N, which flew into the Babin Zub peak on Maganik mountain north of Podgorica. All 41 on board perished.
On 25 January 2005, the nosegear of a Montenegro Airlines Fokker 100 (YU-AOM) collapsed after a runway excursion during a night landing in snowy conditions. The airplane skidded for about  before coming to rest,  after touchdown. Two passengers, the pilot and copilot received minor injuries. The airline was sued by passengers, as it was the only airline to operate flights to Podgorica that evening (other airlines canceled flights due to insufficient ice clearance technology at the airport).
On 7 January 2008, at about 9:30pm, a Montenegro Airlines Fokker 100 (4O-AOK) was shot at while landing at Podgorica Airport. A routine inspection of the aircraft led to the discovery of a bullet hole in the aircraft's tail. The aircraft was carrying 20 passengers, none of which were injured. The reason for the incident is unknown; however, reports indicate that it may have been an inadvertent result of guns being fired during celebrations for Orthodox Christmas.

See also 
 List of airports in Montenegro
 Tivat Airport
 Aeronautical Information Publication

References

External links 

 

Ground Transportation at AirportJump.com

Airports in Montenegro
Airports established in 1961
Transport in Podgorica
1961 establishments in Yugoslavia